Halim Alizehi (also Romanized as Ḩalīm ʿAlīzehī; also known as Ḩalīm) is a village in Dust Mohammad Rural District, in the Central District of Hirmand County, Sistan and Baluchestan Province, Iran. At the 2006 census, its population was 51, in 14 families.

References 

Populated places in Hirmand County